Emperor Yu may refer to:

Yu the Great ( 2200 – 2100 BC), a semi-mythical ruler of ancient China, founder of the Xia dynasty
Jade Emperor, the supreme god in Chinese (especially Taoist) mythology